The 1986 Swedish Golf Tour was the third season of the Swedish Golf Tour, a series of professional golf tournaments held in Sweden.

Schedule
The season consisted of twelve events played between May and September.

Order of Merit

References

Swedish Golf Tour
Swedish Golf Tour